Mark Moors (born January 31, 1957 in Regina, Saskatchewan) is a former offensive lineman  who played ten seasons in the Canadian Football League from 1980 to 1989 for the Calgary Stampeders, Winnipeg Blue Bombers, Ottawa Rough Riders, Hamilton Tiger-Cats and he won one Grey Cup with Winnipeg.

External links
Acadia Axemen profile page

Acadia Hall of Fame Induction Bio

1957 births
Living people
Sportspeople from Regina, Saskatchewan
Canadian football offensive linemen
Players of Canadian football from Saskatchewan
Calgary Stampeders players
Winnipeg Blue Bombers players
Ottawa Rough Riders players
Hamilton Tiger-Cats players
Acadia Axemen football players